Rodrigo Augusto Pastore (born 16 September 1972) is an Argentine basketball coach and former player. Born in Buenos Aires, he played in Germany, Italy and Switzerland.

He started his coaching career in 2006 with SAV Vacallo Basket. In 2015, he became head coach of Niners Chemnitz in the German second division ProA. In 2020, Pastore achieved promotion to the top level Basketball Bundesliga with the Niners.

References

1972 births
Basketball players from Buenos Aires
SAV Vacallo Basket coaches
Niners Chemnitz coaches
Medi Bayreuth players
Telekom Baskets Bonn players
Aurora Basket Jesi players
Pallacanestro Trieste players
Argentine basketball coaches
Argentine expatriate basketball people in Germany
Argentine men's basketball players
Living people
Lugano Tigers players